Clovis Community College is a public community college in northeastern Fresno, California near Clovis. It is in the State Center Community College District (SCCCD) along with Fresno City College and Reedley College (which includes the Madera and Oakhurst Centers). It has a satellite campus on Herndon Avenue in Fresno.

History
Clovis Community College was a North Center of Reedley College until July 1, 2015, when it became a separate campus of SCCCD. It was first known as the Willow International Center and changed to Clovis Community College Center in 2014, before dropping the "center" from the name. The first buildings included an  academic complex housing labs and classrooms as well as a bookstore, internet cafe, and library. Future projects include an additional  academic building which will house a fitness center, student services, offices and classrooms.

Student Life

References

External links
 Official website

Universities and colleges in Fresno County, California
Education in Fresno County, California
California Community Colleges
Education in Fresno, California